Spondias radlkoferi is a species of flowering plant in the cashew family, Anacardiaceae. It is found from southern Mexico to north-western Venezuela in riparian borders and secondary growth forests.  Several species of Neotropical bats in the genus Dermanura are responsible for dispersing many of its seeds.

References

radlkoferi
Cloud forest flora of Mexico
Trees of Central America
Flora of Venezuela
Flora of Colombia